Here We Are is the third studio album by A Global Threat. It was released on April 16, 2002, on Punk Core Records. This album shows the band departing slightly from the sound of Until We Die and What The Fuck Will Change?, incorporating complicated times and music.

Track listing

Personnel
 Bryan Lothian - vocals/guitar
 John Curran - bass guitar
 Mike Graves - drums
 Pete - vocals on "D.F."

References

A Global Threat albums
2002 albums
Punk Core Records albums
Hardcore punk albums by American artists